A kazasker or kadıasker (ḳāḍī'asker, "military judge") was a chief judge in the Ottoman Empire, so named originally because his jurisdiction extended to the cases of soldiers, who were later tried only by their own officers. Two kazaskers were appointed, called Rumeli Kazaskeri and Anadolu Kazaskeri, having their jurisdiction respectively over the European and the Asiatic part of the Empire. They were subordinated to the Grand Vizier, later Şeyhülislam, and had no jurisdiction over the city of Constantinople. Moreover, they attended the meetings at the Imperial Council.

A Kazasker handled appeals to the decisions of kadı's, had the power to overrule these, and suggested kadı candidates to the Grand Vizier.

See also
 Kadı
 List of Ottoman titles and appellations

References

Sources

 
Historical legal occupations
Military of the Ottoman Empire
Government of the Ottoman Empire
Ottoman titles
Ottoman law